Sant'Angelo di Piove di Sacco is a comune (municipality) in the Province of Padua in the Italian region Veneto, located about  west of Venice and about  east of Padua.

The municipality of Sant'Angelo di Piove di Sacco contains the frazioni (subdivisions, mainly villages and hamlets) Vigorovea and Celeseo.

Sant'Angelo di Piove di Sacco borders the following municipalities: Brugine, Campolongo Maggiore, Fossò, Legnaro, Piove di Sacco, Saonara, Vigonovo.

Economy
The airline Alpi Eagles had its head office in Sant'Angelo di Piove di Sacco.

Demographic evolution

References

External links

 Sant'Angelo di Piove di Sacco

Cities and towns in Veneto